AIDS Services of Austin (ASA) is a non-profit AIDS service organization that addresses HIV and AIDS in Central Texas. Founded in 1987, ASA is the region's oldest and largest community-based organization addressing the local AIDS crisis. Annually, they provide direct care services to over 1,500 people and HIV prevention education to over 10,000 people.

In 2020, ASA merged with national HIV/AIDS non-profit Vivent Health. All ASA services now operate under the Vivent Health name.

History

1980s

The first HIV case in Austin was reported in the summer of 1983, known at the time as GRID, or Gay-Related Immune Deficiency.  In the first months of the outbreak, there was no local organization dedicated to the quickly growing crisis.  In August 1983, Paul Clover founded the Waterloo Counseling Center to serve the gay community through queer-positive, affordable mental health services. The Austin AIDS Project was started at Waterloo but would grow, in just four years, to the point where an organization dedicated to AIDS was needed.

Volunteer Beginnings 
In 1987 the Austin AIDS Project was incorporated as AIDS Services of Austin. Throughout ASA's history, volunteers have been instrumental to its growth. One of the volunteer groups formed was the Rubber Fairies, a group which distributed condoms and provided safer sex education. Their efforts garnered praise in an article on Splash Days in a July 1988 issue of The Advocate, a national news magazine reporting on the LGBT community.

Another volunteer organization, the Octopus Club, was organized by Lew Aldridge in 1987. The Octopus Club raises funds through events such as ArtErotica, OctoTea Dance and the Oscar Parties for ASA's Paul Kirby Emergency Relief Fund.

Early politics of AIDS 
In the fall of 1986, the Texas Commissioner of Health proposed quarantining gay men suspected of having HIV and AIDS. Glen Maxey from the Austin AIDS Project organized medical experts to testify before the Texas Legislature against quarantine. On the day the quarantine proposal was withdrawn, Maxey stepped onto the steps of the Texas Department of Health to a throng of cameras. Interviewed by Dan Rather for the CBS Evening News, Maxey was outed as a gay activist. He would go on to become the first openly gay legislator in Texas, landing the first state funding earmark for community-based AIDS service organizations.

1990s
In response to the unique legal issues faced by people living with HIV and AIDS, ASA started the Capital Area AIDS Legal Project, or CAALP, in 1990, primarily to provide wills and other life-planning documents. Their objectives have changed with the epidemic, and today CAALP offers a full array of pro bono legal services to people living with HIV and AIDS.

With the advent of life-prolonging antiretroviral drug therapies, people with HIV were living longer. Pervasive fear of infection remained, but people now needed long-term care and services. Fear and discrimination caused some physicians, especially dentists, to refuse medical and dental treatment to people living with HIV.  In response, in 1992 ASA founded the Jack Sansing Dental Clinic, which still provides quality, affordable dental care.

Programs and services

Case Management 

Case management seeks to assist persons who have difficulty accessing or remaining in primary medical care and for delivering and coordinating HIV and other supportive services. Case management facilitates continuity of care by coordinating client access to an array of services, such as primary medical care, access to health insurance, help with daily living skills, housing, transportation, financial assistance, psychosocial and spiritual support, vocational and educational training and services, mental health programs, substance abuse treatment and legal assistance.

Helping Hands Food Bank and Medical Nutrition Therapy 

The Helping Hands Food Bank empowers people living with HIV and AIDS with the tools to help manage their health through a nutritious diet that is custom tailored to their unique needs. Beyond food, this program offers personal and household hygiene items. The grocery program is open to clients twice a month and serves 450 individuals annually.

Medical Nutrition Therapy, furnished by a licensed and registered dietitian, is available to clients at high risk. This one-on-one treatment involves individualized, in-depth care provided over time, especially nutritional counseling, provision of nutritional supplements, and education.

Testing and Linkage to Care (TLC) 

ASA's TLC program offers free HIV testing services, counseling, and connections to needed community resources.  It is designed to assist individuals in evaluating how their behavior may put them at risk for HIV infection and provide a safe, compassionate, and resource-rich space to discuss challenges and successes in reducing their risk.

The Jack Sansing Dental Clinic 

ASA's Jack Sansing Dental Clinic provides routine and emergency dental care for people living with HIV and AIDS. This includes oral examination, treatment planning, oral surgery, root canal treatment, periodontal therapy, restorative dentistry, removable prosthodontics, treatment of infection and preventative oral health care

For those with suppressed immune systems due to HIV or AIDS, proper dental care is of the utmost importance.

Capital Area AIDS Legal Project (CAALP) 

A volunteer-based organization, CAALP provides free legal assistance to individuals affected by HIV/AIDS whose income is at or below 125% of the federal poverty guidelines. Since 1990, CAALP has helped more than 3,000 people living with HIV in central Texas.

Through referrals to local volunteer attorneys in the community, CAALP undertakes to assist people with a broad range of civil legal issues, including but not limited to, life planning, insurance, discrimination, confidentiality, immigration, public benefits, landlord-tenant disputes, probate and family law.

The Paul Kirby Emergency Relief Fund 

ASA provides emergency relief for individuals when no other sources of funding exist. The Paul Kirby Emergency Relief Fund is the last resort for case managers to assist clients, with much of the funding going for essentials like food, utilities, rent and prescription medication.

Paul Kirby was one of Austin AIDS Project's earliest volunteers. He started AAP's first newsletter, helped organize one of the first support groups for people living with HIV and AIDS and was one of ASA's founding board members. The vast majority of the Fund is thanks to the Octopus Club, an all-volunteer, grassroots organization dedicated to making a difference through raising money for the Fund.

The PATH Risk Reduction Program 

Comprehensive Risk & Counseling Services, commonly known as the PATH Program, provides individual and couples counseling to reduce the transmission of HIV. PATH primarily serves people living with HIV and AIDS, but is also open to HIV- people who report high risk of acquiring the virus. PATH is a harm reduction counseling program, meaning that PATH counselors assess each individual's readiness for change and clients guide the process by identifying problems and goals to address those problems.

The Q Austin 
The Q is an Mpowerment Project of AIDS Services of Austin, making a difference in the lives of young gay, bisexual, and questioning men ages 18–29. The Mpowerment Project can reach large numbers of young gay/bisexual men in a cost-effective manner because it is a community level intervention.

Within The Q Austin space, community partners help create a safe space for Austin's LGBTQIA communities of ALL AGES by organizing events and outreach. Through this support, the message of safer sex practices and well-being can reach a larger audience while raising awareness for the Q and its mission.

Women Rising Project 
The Project is dedicated to strengthening women through programs and activities that provide education, connection, support, advocacy and peer leadership opportunities. The Project was founded in 1995.

Annual Events

AIDS Walk Austin 

AIDS Walk Austin began as From All Walks of Life in 1988 and is ASA's oldest continuous fundraiser. The AIDS Walk is a 5k walk through downtown Austin and includes speeches, music and remembrance. In recent years, it has also featured panels from the AIDS Memorial Quilt.

Dining Out for Life 
Since 1992, ASA has hosted Dining Out for Life to directly benefit their mission to enhance the health and well-being of Central Texans affected by HIV and AIDS. In 2015, Dining Out for Life raised $4.23 million nationally to provide vital services to people living with HIV and AIDS. All money raised for AIDS Services of Austin's Dining Out for Life event stays local.

Viva 
Viva, also known as Viva Las Vegas, is an ASA fundraiser that traditionally features faux gambling. In 2009, the event began featuring a fashion show, labeled by Austin American-Statesman social columnist Michael Barnes as the "Best Austin fashion show ever."

References

External links 
 AIDS Services of Austin

Organizations established in 1987
HIV/AIDS activism
HIV/AIDS organizations in the United States